Lanear Sampson (born July 17, 1990) is a Canadian football wide receiver for the Ottawa Redblacks of the Canadian Football League. He played college football for the Baylor Bears. He has also played on the practice squads of Indianapolis Colts, Dallas Cowboys, and Pittsburgh Steelers.

References

1990 births
Living people
Dallas Cowboys players
Baylor Bears football players
Ottawa Redblacks players
American football wide receivers
Canadian football wide receivers